Daphne Melissa Herrera Monge (born 10 October 1996), known as Melissa Herrera, is a Costa Rican footballer who plays as a forward for French Division 1 Féminine club FC Girondins de Bordeaux and the Costa Rica women's national team.

Club career 
Herrera began her career by playing for AD Moravia in Costa Rica. Herrera then played in United Women's Soccer for FC Indiana for a short time in 2016. From May 2017 to July 2018 she played for Colombian club Independiente Santa Fe. 

In July 2018, she moved to France to join Reims.

On 8 June 2021, it was announced that she had reached an agreement to sign for FC Girondins de Bordeaux.

International career
She started playing with Costa Rica U20 in 2013.  She played all three of Costa Rica's matches at the 2015 FIFA Women's World Cup. On 13 June 2015, during Costa Rica's second match in the tournament against South Korea, she scored the opening goal of the match which ended 2–2.

International goals

Honours 
Costa Rica
Winner
 Central American Games: 2013

References

External links
 
 Profile  at Fedefutbol
 

1996 births
Living people
Costa Rican women's footballers
Costa Rica women's international footballers
Costa Rican expatriate sportspeople in France
Expatriate women's footballers in France
2015 FIFA Women's World Cup players
People from Heredia Province
Women's association football forwards
Footballers at the 2015 Pan American Games
F.C. Indiana players
Central American Games gold medalists for Costa Rica
Central American Games medalists in football
Division 1 Féminine players
Stade de Reims Féminines players
Pan American Games competitors for Costa Rica